Bryanston  is a village and civil parish in north Dorset, England, situated on the River Stour  west of Blandford Forum. In the 2011 census the parish had a population of 925.  The village is adjacent to the grounds of Bryanston School, an independent school.

The village was named after Brian de Lisle, a Baron at the court of King John. The Rogers family owned it for a long period of time, and it was later purchased by Sir William Portman, 6th Baronet, who took part in crushing Monmouth's rebellion in 1685. Since 1927 the building has been the home of Bryanston School. In 1950 Viscount Portman gave up the Bryanston Estates as part payment of death duties. The estate was then owned by the crown until 2015 when the estate was purchased by a UK company held on behalf of the Viscount Rothermere and his son the Hon Vere Harmsworth for an undisclosed sum.

See also 
 Bryanston Square in London

References

External links 

Villages in Dorset